The OKI Telepizza Challenge was a golf tournament on the Challenge Tour, played in Spain. It was held 1999 at Golf del Guadiana in Badajoz.

Winners

References

External links
Coverage on the Challenge Tour's official site

Former Challenge Tour events
Golf tournaments in Spain